
Year 480 (CDLXXX) was a leap year starting on Tuesday (link will display the full calendar) of the Julian calendar. At the time, it was known as the Year of the Consulship of Basilius without colleague (or, less frequently, year 1233 Ab urbe condita). The denomination 480 for this year has been used since the early medieval period, when the Anno Domini calendar era became the prevalent method in Europe for naming years.

Events 
 By place 

 Byzantine Empire 
 Emperor Zeno officially dissolves the east/west co-emperorship, ruling as the first sole emperor of Rome in 85 years. The position of emperor is never again divided.

 Balkans 
 Julius Nepos, former emperor of the Western Roman Empire, dies in exile in Dalmatia (he is murdered by his own soldiers, in his villa, near Salona). 
 December 9 – Odoacer occupies Dalmatia and prosecutes Nepos's killers. He later establishes his political power with the co-operation of the Roman Senate.

 Europe 
 King Chilperic I dies and is succeeded by his nephew Gundobad, whose realm covers much of eastern Gaul and has two capitals, at Lyon and Geneva. He rules the Kingdom of Burgundy with his brothers Chilperic II, Gundomar and Godegisel.
 Syagrius, ruler of Domain of Soissons, manages to maintain the Roman authority in northern Gaul. He defends his "kingdom" against the neighbouring Salian Franks.
 The Visigoths under King Euric extend their rule from the Loire to Gibraltar (approximate date).
 Ireland: The Diocese of Connor is erected.

 Asia 
 Budhagupta, ruler of the Gupta Empire, establishes diplomatic relations with the Kannauj Kingdom and drives the Huns out of the fertile plains of northern India.
 Prince Seinei succeeds his father Yūryaku and becomes the 22nd emperor of Japan.

 By topic 
 Religion 
 Constantius of Lyon begins his research for his book Vita sancta Germani ("on the Life of Germanus"). He also writes a hagiography of Germanus of Auxerre (approximate date).

Births 
 Baderic, king of the Thuringii (approximate date)
 Benedict of Nursia, monasticist (approximate date)
 Boethius, Roman  philosopher and writer (d. 524)
 Dignāga, Buddhist founder of Indian logic (d. 540)
 Eutharic, Visigothic prince (approximate date)
 Gelimer, king of the Vandals and Alans (d. 553)
 Scholastica, Christian nun (approximate date)
 Xiao Zhaowen, emperor of Southern Qi (d. 494)
 Zu Gengzhi, Chinese mathematician (d. 525)

Deaths 
 Chilperic I, king of Burgundy
 Conall Cremthainne, king of Uisneach (Ireland)
 Erbin of Dumnonia, Brythonic king (approximate date)
 Julius Nepos, Western Roman Emperor
 Nechtan I, king of the Picts
 Tydfil, female saint (approximate date)

References